EXIT Theatre is an alternative theater located at 156 Eddy Street, San Francisco, California, in the downtown Tenderloin neighborhood.  The theater operates four storefront theaters and annually produces the San Francisco Fringe Festival, the second oldest fringe festival in the U.S. and the largest grass roots theater festival in the San Francisco Bay Area, and DIVAfest, dedicated to creating new plays by women writers.

EXIT Theatre began in 1983 when the founder and artistic director Christina Augello directed a group of retired vaudevillians and method actors in two performances of a new play in the lobby of a San Francisco residential hotel.
 
Early plays at EXIT Theatre include Sadie’s Turn (the first full-length play by noted Native American poet Mary TallMountain), Mystery of the Fourth Wall (the West Coast premiere in 1989 of Mary Zimmerman), and Like (the first full production of beat poet Diane di Prima’s 35-year-old sound play). More recently, EXIT Theatre  showed plays such as Breaking Rules, Broken Hearts: Loving across Borders (the second solo show by tenure professor-turned-storyteller Ada Cheng) in January 2018.

Recent premieres by EXIT Theatre include Waiting for FEMA by Karen Ripley and Annie Larson, and Guns and Ammunition by Sarah McKereghan.  Other new work included mugwumpin's Nightgown Symphony, RIPE Theatre's Arrythmmica and resident playwright Sean Owens' Odd By Nature, selected “San Francisco’s Best Comic Playwright” by SF Weekly.  EXIT Theatre toured Last of the Red Hot Dadas by Kerry Reid and Naught But Pirates by Sean Owens to New York City where EXIT Theatre co-founded the FRIGID New York festival.  Notable productions by independent theaters at EXIT Theatre included the world premiere of Babylon Heights by Irvine Welsh (of Trainspotting fame) and Dean Cavanagh, a new authorized translation of No Exit by Jean-Paul Sartre, the premiere of One Big Lie by Liz Duffy Adams, and an incendiary Death of the Last Black Man in the Whole Entire World by Suzan-Lori Parks.

In 1992 EXIT Theatre founded the San Francisco Fringe Festival.  The Fringe Festival is a non-censored and non-curated theater festival and performers are selected through a public lottery.  The Fringe presents about 200 performances by about 35 different performing groups during the twelve-day festival which starts the Wednesday after Labor Day.  Performances are at EXIT Theatre and other locations in downtown San Francisco.

In 2002 EXIT Theatre founded DIVAfest and premieres have included Last of the Red Hot Dadas by Kerry Reid with a soundscape by Pamela Z (based on Dada artist Baroness Elsa von Fretag Loringhoven); E.O. 9066 by Liebe Wetzel (a found object play based on the Executive Order 9066 that interned Japanese Americans during World War II); and Crystal Daze by Deborah Eubanks (dealing with mothers, daughters and methamphetamine addiction).

References

External links
Theater's website

Theatre companies in San Francisco
Performing groups established in 1983